Cochonnaille is a pork product and can refer to an assortment of sausages with or without pâtés that is served as a first course.

See also
Cochon

References

Pork dishes